Isoleucas is a genus of flowering plants in the mint family, Lamiaceae, first described in 1939. It is native to Yemen and Somalia.

Species
Isoleucas arabica O.Schwartz - Yemen
Isoleucas somala (Patzak) Scheen - Somalia (= Ballota somala Patzak, Otostegia somala (Patzak) Sebald)

References

Lamiaceae
Lamiaceae genera